Robert Maxwell Weber (April 22, 1924 – October 20, 2016) was an American cartoonist, known for over 1,400 cartoons that appeared in The New Yorker from 1962 to 2007. Born in Los Angeles, he served in the Coast Guard during World War II and later studied at the Pratt Institute and Art Students League of New York.  He worked as a fashion illustrator for Harper's Bazaar and other magazines before becoming a cartoonist. He died in Branford, Connecticut, at the age of 92.

References

1924 births
2016 deaths
American cartoonists
The New Yorker cartoonists
Pratt Institute alumni
Artists from Los Angeles
Military personnel from California
United States Coast Guard personnel of World War II
Fashion illustrators